Vâlcelele is a commune in Buzău County, Muntenia, Romania. It is composed of a single village, Vâlcelele.

Sister city
Vâlcelele is twinned with Trébeurden, France, since 1989.

Notes

Communes in Buzău County
Localities in Muntenia